Bozkov is a municipality and village in Semily District in the Liberec Region of the Czech Republic. It has about 600 inhabitants. It is known for the Bozkovské Dolomite Caves.

Geography

It lies in a hilly landscape of the Giant Mountains Foothills.

History
The first written mention of Bozkov is from 1356. The most notable owners of Bozkov were the Smiřičký of Smiřice family (in the 16th century), Albrecht von Wallenstein (in 1622–1634), the Desfours family (in 1635–1748), and the Caretto-Millesimo family (in 1748–1824). In 1923, Bozkov was promoted to a market town, but lost the title after World War II.

Sights
Bozkov is known for the Bozkovské Dolomite Caves. They were formed due to a strong corrosive activity of the underground water in the lentil of calcareous metamorphosed dolomites, in some parts strongly silificated. Since 1999, they has been protected as a national nature monument. Their lower parts are permanently flooded and form the largest underground lake in Bohemia.

The most valuable building in Bozkov is Church of the Visitation of the Virgin Mary. It was built in 1697 and contains a rare Gothic sculpture of the Madonna, locally called "Queen of the Mountains".

References

External links

Villages in Semily District